The state border–Lendava railway is a  long railway line in and Slovenia that connects the Croatian L101 railway, linking Čakovec and Lendava with each other and is connected to further railway lines in Čakovec. The route is non-electrified and single-tracked. The route was built in 1889 as Zalaegerszeg–Čakovec railway, but in 1945, after World War II, the route was dismantled between Lendava and Rédics. Slovenian Railways plans to rebuild the section between Lendava and Rédics.

Gallery

Maps

References

External links

Railway lines in Slovenia